Andrea Hirata (born October 24, 1967) is an Indonesian author best known for the 2005 novel Laskar Pelangi ("The Rainbow Troops") and its sequels.

Biography
Hirata was born in Gantung, Belitung. While he was young, his parents changed his name seven times. They eventually settled on the name Andrea, while the name Hirata was given by his mother. He grew up in a poor family not far from a government-owned mine.

Hirata started his tertiary education with a degree in economics from the University of Indonesia. After receiving a scholarship from the European Union, he did his master's degree in Europe, first at the University of Paris then at Sheffield Hallam University in Britain; his thesis dealt with telecommunications and the economy.

Hirata released Laskar Pelangi in 2005. The novel, was written in a period of six months, and was based on his childhood experiences in Belitung; he later described it as "an irony about a lack of access to education for children in one of the world's wealthiest islands.". The novel went on to sell five million copies, with pirated editions selling 15 million more. It also spawned three sequels: Sang Pemimpi (The Dreamer), Edensor and Maryamah Karpov.

Laskar Pelangi was adapted into a film of the same name in 2008 by directors Riri Riza and Mira Lesmana; the film became the most-viewed Indonesian film of all time, being seen by 5 million viewers during its theatrical run. He also worked at the telecommunications company Telkom Indonesia, eventually quitting to focus on writing. In 2010 the international rights for the Laskar Pelangi tetralogy were bought by American agent Amer & Asia; the rights were later acquired by Kathleen Anderson Literary Management. Afterwards, Hirata opened a library in his hometown.

By 2010, he was spending weekends in Belitung and weekdays in Java. He later published his first English-language short story, "Dry Season", in Washington Square Review. That same year, he spent three months attending a writer's workshop at the University of Iowa.

In 2011, television network SCTV announced a 15-episode serial adaption of Laskar Pelangi; Hirata had previously said he would not allow such an adaptation, but later relented as he felt the network could guarantee quality. By 2012 the English translation of Laskar Pelangi had been picked up by FSG, Penguin Books, and Random House for sale in twenty countries; Hirata was the first Indonesian writer to be published with FSG. That year he was a speaker at the Byron Bay Writers Festival.

Awards
Winner of New York Book Festival 2013 in general fiction category 

Granted an Honorary Doctor of Letters (Hon DLitt) from University of Warwick, UK 2015

Bibliography
 Laskar Pelangi (2005)
 Sang Pemimpi (2006)
 Edensor (2007)
 Maryamah Karpov (2008)
 Padang Bulan & Cinta di Dalam Gelas (2010)
 Sebelas Patriot (2011)
 Ayah (2015)
 Sirkus Pohon (2017)
 '' Orang-Orang Biasa (2019)
 Guru Aini (2020)

References

 
 
 
 
 
 
 
 
 
 

1967 births
Living people
Indonesian male novelists
Indonesian male writers
People from East Belitung Regency
University of Paris alumni
University of Indonesia alumni
Alumni of Sheffield Hallam University